William Walker Tait (born 1929) is an emeritus professor of philosophy at the University of Chicago, where he served as a faculty member from 1972 to 1996, and as department chair from 1981 to 1987.

Education and career

Tait received his B.A. from Lehigh University in 1952, and his Ph.D. from Yale University in 1958. Frederic Fitch served as his doctoral advisor.

Prior to teaching at Chicago he held positions at Stanford University from 1958 to 1964, the University of Illinois at Chicago from 1965 to 1971, and the University of Aarhus from 1971 to 1972. In 1966, he signed a tax resistance vow to protest the Vietnam War. In 2002, he was elected as a Fellow of the American Academy of Arts and Sciences.

Publications
Early analytic philosophy : Frege, Russell, Wittgenstein : essays in honor of Leonard Linsky / edited by William W. Tait. Chicago, Ill. : Open Court, c1997. vii, 291 p. : ill. ; 24 cm.  (cloth : alk. paper),  (pbk. : alk. paper)
 Tait, William W. The provenance of pure reason : essays in the philosophy of mathematics and its history / William Tait. Oxford ; New York : Oxford University Press, c2005. viii, 332 p. : ill., ; 25 cm.

See also
American philosophy
List of American philosophers

References

External links
Official Chicago page
Some Publications DBLP
 

1929 births
Living people
American philosophers
American tax resisters
University of Chicago faculty
University of Illinois Chicago faculty
Academic staff of Aarhus University
Stanford University faculty
Lehigh University alumni
Yale University alumni
Mathematical logicians
Fellows of the American Academy of Arts and Sciences
Activists from California
Tarski lecturers